The Biggest Thing Since Colossus is an album by American blues musician Otis Spann, released in 1969. The album is also notable for the fact that Spann's backing band on this occasion were members of Fleetwood Mac, who were touring in America at the time. Spann had been involved in the recording of the Blues Jam at Chess album, and a rapport had been struck between Spann and the British band, which led to their participation on Spann's new album.

It was agreed beforehand that Spann's friend and longtime associate S.P. Leary would play drums on the album, and Fleetwood Mac drummer Mick Fleetwood did not take part in the recording. Guitarists Peter Green and Danny Kirwan, and bassist John McVie all contributed to the sessions.

"Walkin was released as a single in some countries, with "Temperature Is Rising (98.8°F)" (a different version to that found on the album) on the B-side. Another track was recorded at the sessions, "Blues for Hippies", which was not included on the album. An expanded version was released in 2006 on a double CD (Otis Spann, The Complete Blue Horizon Sessions) with all tracks from the sessions plus the single "Bloody Murder" and both single and album versions of "Temperature is Rising".

Track listing
All tracks written by Otis Spann except where indicated.
"My Love Depends on You" – 5:22
"Walkin – 2:54
"It Was a Big Thing" – 3:26
"Temperature Is Rising (100.2°F)" – 6:13
"Dig You" – 3:04
"No More Doggin'" (Rosco Gordon) – 3:00
"Ain't Nobody's Business" (Jimmy Witherspoon) – 5:15
"She Needs Some Loving" – 3:08
"I Need Some Air" – 4:40
"Someday Baby" – 3:02

Personnel
Otis Spann – piano, vocals
Peter Green – guitar
Danny Kirwan – guitar
John McVie – bass guitar
S.P. Leary – drums

Production
Mike Vernon – producer
Warren Slaten – engineer
Richard Vernon – coordination 
Sleeve Design / Photography – Terence Ibbott

References

Fleetwood Mac
Otis Spann albums
1969 albums
Albums produced by Mike Vernon (record producer)
Blue Horizon Records albums